Glen Esk is a locality in the Somerset Region, Queensland, Australia.

Geography 
The locality is on the western side of Lake Wivenhoe created by the Wivenhoe Dam across the Brisbane River, although the lake and its shoreline are within the locality of Lake Wivenhoe.

The southern part of the locality is mostly .

The predominant land use is cattle grazing.

History 
The locality presumably takes its name from Mount Esk. The mountain and the associated pastoral station were named by  pastoralists David Graham and James Ivory in 1843 after the Esk River in Scotland.

A police station was constructed at Glen Esk in 1877.

Glen Esk State School opened circa 1932 and closed circa 1955.

Education 

References

Further reading 

 

Suburbs of Somerset Region
Localities in Queensland